This is a list of q-analogs in mathematics and related fields.

Algebra 
 Iwahori–Hecke algebra
 Quantum affine algebra
 Quantum enveloping algebra
 Quantum group

Analysis 
 Jackson integral
 q-derivative
 q-difference polynomial
 Quantum calculus

Combinatorics 
 LLT polynomial 
 q-binomial coefficient
 q-Pochhammer symbol
 q-Vandermonde identity

Orthogonal polynomials  
 q-Bessel polynomials
 q-Charlier polynomials
 q-Hahn polynomials
 q-Jacobi polynomials:
Big q-Jacobi polynomials
Continuous q-Jacobi polynomials
Little q-Jacobi polynomials
 q-Krawtchouk polynomials
 q-Laguerre polynomials
 q-Meixner polynomials
 q-Meixner–Pollaczek polynomials
 q-Racah polynomials

Probability and statistics  
 Gaussian q-distribution
 q-exponential distribution
 q-Weibull diribution
 Tsallis q-Gaussian
 Tsallis entropy

Special functions 
 Basic hypergeometric series
 Elliptic gamma function
 Hahn–Exton q-Bessel function 
 Jackson q-Bessel function
 q-exponential
 q-gamma function
 q-theta function

See also  
 Lists of mathematics topics

Q-analogs